Chinese Taipei competed at the 2008 Summer Paralympics in Beijing, China. The delegation consisted of seventeen competitors in six sports: archery, track and field athletics, powerlifting, shooting, swimming, and table tennis. The athletes were ten men and seven women ranging in age from 27 to 53 years old.

"Chinese Taipei" is the delegation name used since 1979 by athletes from Taiwan and the Taiwan Area at the Olympic and Paralympic Games. Thus, Chinese Taipei's participation in the Beijing Paralympics did not contradict the One China policy and was not objected to by the People's Republic of China.

As in previous editions of the Summer Paralympics, the flag of the Republic of China was not displayed. Instead, the Chinese Taipei Paralympic flag was used when Taiwanese athletes won medals. When Lin Tzu-hui of Chinese Taipei won a gold medal, the National Banner Song, not the National Anthem of the Republic of China, was played at the medal ceremony.

Three days before the beginning of the Games, the Taipei Times reported that two of Chinese Taipei's star athletes, double Paralympic champion Chiang Chih-chung and world athletics champion Chen Ming-tsai, had been barred from attending by the International Paralympic Committee. The Times added that no reason had been given for the ban, even after the Chinese Taipei Paralympic Committee had requested an explanation from the IPC. A representative of the CTPC stated that the People's Republic of China may have "interfered for political reasons" to prevent Chiang and Chen from participating in the Games. The Taipei Times article was subsequently reproduced on the Taiwanese government's website.

Medalists

Chinese Taipei won two medals, a gold and a bronze.

Sports

Archery

|-
|align=left|Chen Wu Ying
|rowspan=2 align=left|Men's individual recurve W1/W2
|552
|26
|L 99-104
|colspan=5|did not advance
|-
|align=left|Tseng Lung Hui
|625
|6
|W 104-85
|W 106-98
|W 105-104
|L 101-103
|W *92-92
|
|}

* Tseng won 9 arrows to 6 arrows shot by Ozgur Ozen of Turkey in the bronze medal match.

Athletics

Powerlifting

Shooting

Men

Women

Swimming

Table tennis

Men

Women

See also
Chinese Taipei at the Paralympics
Chinese Taipei at the 2008 Summer Olympics

References

External links
Beijing 2008 Paralympic Games Official Site
International Paralympic Committee

Nations at the 2008 Summer Paralympics
2008
Paralympics